Ebraucus (/Efrog) was a legendary king of the Britons, as recounted by Geoffrey of Monmouth.  He was the son of King Mempricius before he abandoned the family.

Following the death of his father, Mempricius, he became king and reigned 39 years.  According to Geoffrey, he was admired, tall, and remarkably strong.  He was the first to wage war on the Gauls since the time of Brutus.  By pillaging the cities and shores and slaughtering many men, he became extremely wealthy and enriched the lands of Britain.

He founded two settlements: Kaerebrauc, the City of Ebraucus (Eboracum), north of the Humber (this later became York, whose Welsh name is Efrog); and Alclud in Albany (now part of Dunbarton, capital of Strathclyde). According to Polydore Vergil he "builded the town of Maidens, now called Edinburgh Castle, being planted in the uttermost part of Britain, now called Scotland". The Registrum Malmesburiense also says he built the "castle of Montrose".

He had twenty wives who produced twenty sons and thirty daughters.  All his daughters he sent to his cousin Silvius Alba in Alba Longa (Italy) to be married to the other Trojan descendants.  Except for Brutus Greenshield, all of Ebraucus's sons, led by Assaracus, went to Germany, creating a kingdom there.  Brutus thus succeeded Ebraucus upon his death.

References

Legendary British kings